Khardiha is a village in the Karail area of the Mohammadabad tehsil in Ghazipur district, Uttar Pradesh, India. It has population of 1896 as per 2011 Census. It has its own local administration under Panchayati Raj system, with Gram Pradhan as head of local administration. Since the very beginning this village has been an important center of education and cultural activities.

History
In 1541 ce, when Sultan Sher Shah Suri was ruling the country after defeating the Moghul emperor Nasir ud-din Muhammad Humayun in the battle of Chausa, the foundation of village KHAIRA DEEH was laid down by Babu Madhav Rai, elder son of Kunwar Narayan Shah of Kuresar-Naraianpur branch of Mulhan Dikshit family.

Khardiha belongs to Tallukedar Babu Madhav Rai's family. In sixth generation of Babu Madhav Rai's descendant elder brother Babu Ugrasen Rai got the zamindari of  Kundesar and younger brother Babu Vikram Rai moved to 'Kharhiyan'. In spite of being a small village compared to the nearby Joga Musahib, Awathahi, Gondaur, Kanuaan, Amarupur and Siyadeeh, Khardiha is considered an important place by neighbouring villages.

Local administration

Before 1995 Kardiha had Musardeva, Shahpura, Gyanpur, Lalapur, Alapur and Navpura village under its panchayat. But now only one village comes under Khardiha panchayat. Khardiha gram sabha had people from every social strata as its Pradhan. List of former Pradhans of this village after independence is mentioned below :

Late Shivshwaroop Rai
Late Keshav Prasad Rai
Late Kapildev Rai
Late Rajnarain Ram (1983-1988)
Shri Ramchandra Rai (1988-2006)
Shrimati Maya Kharwar

Schools and temples 
Temples such as Mahavir Ji, Brahma baba shrine, Budhva Shivji and Durgaji are famous. The village has three primary  schools, one government added Shri Sarvodaya Inter college and Khardiha Degree College. Late Brij Mangal Rai established both the colleges. There was a time when Khardiha was an education center for neighboring villages. However situation has deteriorated. Khardiha’s past glory is faded with the passage of time.

Transport
The village is at a distance of nearly 36 km from Ghazipur city Railway station and UP Roadways Ghazipur depot. Other nearby railway stations are Karimuddinpur, Yusufpur and Buxar railway station.  Khardiha can be reached through road transport by mean of private vehicles or rented vehicles, such as buses and Taxies.

Administration
Khardia comes under Bhanwarkol block, and Mohammadabad vidhansabha of Ballia Lok Sabha constituency. Although the Tehsil under which it is administered is Mohammadabad, comes under Ghazipur district.

Agriculture
Agriculture is the main source of income and living for the residents, nearly all type of food grains which are cultivated in eastern UP are also produced here, popular crops include wheat, paddy and potatoes, though other crops such as mustard, lentils, grams are also produced in large quantities, the village has privately owned rice mills and oil mills. Farmers often sell their products either in the local market or in the anaj mandi (government food grains store house) located in yusufpur. Farming is done with semi modern and semi classical techniques, tractors electrical water pumping sets are used for farming but bigger machines like harvesters are also used in the village.

Language and culture 
Language spoken by majority in the village is a mix of Bhojpuri and Hindi, though Urdu has also a great influence on it. Culturally the area is much influenced by Varanasi which is a major cultural center nearby.

Notable people
 Indian Independence activist Brij Mangal Rai was born in this village on 14 January 1914.
 Renowned literary figure Viveki Rai started his career in Khardiha Inter College.

Nearby places 
Ghazipur
Ballia
Buxar
Varanasi
Mughalsarai
Patna
Mohammadabad, Ghazipur
Rajapur, Ghazipur
Sherpur, Ghazipur

References

External links
Villages in Ghazipur  Uttar Pradesh

Villages in Ghazipur district